Pongsak Hrientounthong (born 20 July 1973) is a Thai boxer. He competed in the men's light welterweight event at the 2000 Summer Olympics.

References

External links
 

1973 births
Living people
Pongsak Hrientounthong
Pongsak Hrientounthong
Boxers at the 2000 Summer Olympics
Place of birth missing (living people)
Asian Games medalists in boxing
Boxers at the 1998 Asian Games
Pongsak Hrientounthong
Medalists at the 1998 Asian Games
Light-welterweight boxers
Pongsak Hrientounthong